Rajabasa is an isolated 1281-m-high conical volcano along the Sunda Strait at the most southeastern point of Sumatra. 
It has a well-preserved 500 x 700 m summit crater with a swampy floor. The volcano is covered with vegetation. Although fumarolic activity occurs on the foot and flanks of the volcano and increased activity was reported in April 1863 and May 1892, it is not known when it last erupted.

See also 

 List of volcanoes in Indonesia

References 

Stratovolcanoes of Indonesia
Mountains of Sumatra
Volcanoes of Sumatra
Landforms of Banten